Joseph G. Daher (1913 – September 21, 1993) was an American college basketball and football coach. A graduate of Juniata College, Daher coached the Manhattan Jaspers from 1942 to 1943 as well as the VMI Keydets basketball program from 1943 to 1945. He also coached three sports at Morris Harvey College (now known as the University of Charleston) in Charleston, West Virginia for three years. In 1940, Daher coauthored a book entitled "Fundamentals of Basketball" with the great Clair Bee. Additionally, Daher spent two seasons as a pitcher with the Pittsburgh Pirates in 1933 and 1934.

Coaching career
Daher began coaching at Morris Harvey College, which has now been known as the University of Charleston since 1978. From 1939 to 1942, Daher coached the Golden Eagles in basketball and baseball, and assisted the football team as well. He then left for Manhattan College, where, in his first and only season, led the Jaspers basketball squad to an 18–3 record. This ranks him 15th all-time at Manhattan in terms of wins, and first in winning percentage.

Following a year in Manhattan, Daher then joined the Virginia Military Institute in Lexington, Virginia as the tight ends football coach, as well as head basketball coach. In two seasons, the Keydets were 2–24 under Daher, an .077 winning percentage. This ranks Daher 26th at VMI in total wins and 27th (last) in terms of winning percentage.

Personal life
Daher was born in 1913 to his parents George Joseph and Selma Daher. He had a sister, Sadie, and three brothers, Vincent, Bernard, and Mitchell. He graduated from Juniata College in Huntingdon, Pennsylvania. At Juniata, Daher played and lettered in three sports. Daher then earned his master's degree at Bucknell University, where he was a pitcher on the Bison's baseball team.

In the latter stages of World War II, Daher took a hiatus from coaching and enlisted in the Army in 1945. At the time he was residing in Roanoke, Virginia. Daher spent the later part of his life living in Dayton, Ohio. He was married for 49 years to his wife Marguerite Alouf, who died in June 2015.  They are survived by their four children: Richard, Selma, Joseph, and John.  Daher was made an honorary member of the VMI Class of 1947.

Head coaching record

Basketball

References

1913 births
1993 deaths
Basketball coaches from Pennsylvania
Basketball players from Pennsylvania
Bucknell Bison baseball players
Charleston Golden Eagles baseball coaches
Charleston Golden Eagles football coaches
Charleston Golden Eagles men's basketball coaches
Charleston Golden Eagles men's basketball players
Juniata Eagles baseball players
Juniata Eagles football players
Manhattan Jaspers basketball coaches
Baseball players from Pennsylvania
VMI Keydets basketball coaches
VMI Keydets football coaches
American men's basketball players
United States Army personnel of World War II